"All Hope Is Gone" is a song by American heavy metal band Slipknot, released as the first single and title track from the album All Hope Is Gone. It was released on June 20, 2008, as a free MP3 on the band's website, after which it was released as a paid download on June 23.

The song was originally announced by blabbermouth.net to be "a heavier track" from All Hope Is Gone, scheduled to begin airplay on June 15. "All Hope Is Gone" is also the first title track from a Slipknot album to be released as a single.

Themes and production
In an interview with Kerrang! drummer Joey Jordison revealed that "All Hope Is Gone" is a true collaborative effort between the band and was one of the final songs recorded for the band's fourth studio album of the same name. "The song, music and theme speak for itself. It's a song about the world at stake: all the situations at hand, be it personal or worldly, and trying to turn things into a positive. Sometimes you have to face the grotesque to bring about something amazing". Jordison went on to say, "I actually demoed this song alone and didn't know what would come of it as we were nearing the end of the album. I was hoping it would make it. I knew it would, once everyone spewed their venom upon it".

Of the song's conception, Jordison said, "A lot of the grind riffs for the verses were made of riffs Paul had years ago, way before Slipknot. Funny how things won't die. Mick came in and fucking set fire to the track and Jim Root followed as well. Once Corey put his fucking vocals on it, that was it, man. That guy's voice and conviction could sell narcotics to a nun".

Track listing
 "All Hope Is Gone" – 4:45

Charts

References

2008 singles
2008 songs
Slipknot (band) songs
Songs written by Corey Taylor
Songs written by Paul Gray (American musician)
Roadrunner Records singles
Songs written by Joey Jordison
Songs written by Jim Root
Thrash metal songs
Metalcore songs